Dolní Bousov is a town in Mladá Boleslav District in the Central Bohemian Region of the Czech Republic. It has about 2,800 inhabitants.

Administrative parts
Villages of Bechov, Horní Bousov, Ošťovice, Střehom, Svobodín and Vlčí Pole are administrative parts of Dolní Bousov. Svobodín forms an exclave of the municipal territory.

Geography
It lies in the Jičín Uplands.

The Klenice River flows through the town.

History
The first written mention of Bousov is from 1318. The wooden church of Saint Catherine was documented in 1352. Before 1497, Dolní Bousov was promoted to a town. The town flourished during the rule of the Lobkowicz family at the end of the 16th century. In 1600, Emperor Rudolf II granted Dolní Bousov a coat of arms and several privileges.

At the end of the Thirty Years' War, the town was burned down by the Swedish troops. After the war, the town was acquired by the Czernin family and development continued. Further economic development occurred in the 19th century, when the imperial road from Mladá Boleslav to Sobotka was opened in 1842 and the railway in 1883.

Demographics

Sights

The most valuable building is the Church of Saint Catherine. The current Baroque church was built in 1759–1760.

The landmarks of the town square are the Empire style town hall from 1861, and the Marian column from the 18th century in the middle of the square.

The folk architecture in the village of Střehom is well preserved. The village is protected as a village monument zone. The most valuable building in Střehom is a Renaissance mill.

Notable people
Eugen Wratislaw von Mitrowitz (1786–1867), Austrian field marshal

References

External links

Cities and towns in the Czech Republic
Populated places in Mladá Boleslav District